Fereydoun Keshavarz (1907–2006) was an Iranian physician and communist politician.

Early life and education 
The son of a merchant from Gilan who had taken part in the Persian Constitutional Revolution, Keshavarz studied in Dar ul-Funun before going to study medicine in France. He taught at University of Tehran after he returned to Iran.

Career 
Keshavarz entered politics in 1941, and joined Tudeh Party of Iran three months after its creation. A leading member of the party, he was elected to its first central committee and served as the party's parliamentary spokesperson. In the summer of 1946 he was named a minister in Qavam's coalition cabinet. He broke away from the party in 1958, because he came to believe that "Tudeh's policy is a betrayal of the working class".

References

 

Government ministers of Iran
1907 births
2006 deaths
Central Committee of the Tudeh Party of Iran members
Tudeh Party of Iran MPs
Members of the 14th Iranian Majlis